Abdullahi Ahmed An-Na'im (born in 1946) is a Sudanese-born Islamic scholar who lives  in the United States and teaches at Emory University. He is the Charles Howard Candler Professor of Law at Emory University School of Law, associated professor in the Emory College of Arts and Sciences, and Senior Fellow of the Center for the Study of Law and Religion of Emory University.

An internationally recognized scholar of Islam and human rights and human rights in cross-cultural perspectives, Professor An-Na'im teaches courses in international law, comparative law, human rights, and Islamic law. His research interests include constitutionalism in Islamic and African countries, secularism, and Islam and politics. Professor An-Na'im directed the following research projects which focus on advocacy strategies for reform through internal cultural transformation:

 Women and Land in Africa
 Islamic Family Law
 Fellowship Program in Islam and Human Rights
 The Future of Sharia: Islam and the Secular State

Professor An-Na'im's current research projects include a study of Muslims and the secular state, and of human rights from state-centric to people-centered. He continues to further develop his theory advanced in his book Islam and the Secular State.

Biography
Early life
An-Naim was born in the Sudan, where he was greatly influenced by the Islamic reform movement of Mahmoud Mohamed Taha. He is a naturalized American citizen, but retains Sudanese citizenship.

Education
An-Naim earned a PhD (Law) from University of Edinburgh (Scotland) in 1976; LLB (Honours) and Diploma in Criminology at University of Cambridge (England), 1973; LLB (Honours) at University of Khartoum (Sudan), 1970.

Career
In February 2009, An-Na`im received an Honorary Doctorate from the Université catholique de Louvain (UCL, Louvain-la-Neuve) and Katholieke Universiteit Leuven (K.U. Leuven, Leuven), Belgium. He also serves as Global Legal Scholar at the Law School, University of Warwick, UK (until November 2009); and Extraordinary Professor at the Centre for Human Rights, Faculty of Law, University of Pretoria (until November 2009).

Publications

Author
Complementary, Not Competing, Claims of Law and Religion: An Islamic Perspective 
An Inclusive Approach to the Mediation of Competing Human Rights Claims 
Islam and Human Rights: Beyond the Zero-Sum Game
Muslims and Global Justice. Philadelphia, PA: University of Pennsylvania Press (2010).
Islam and the Secular State: Negotiating the Future of Shari'a. Cambridge, MA and London, England: Harvard University Press (2008). (also published in Arabic and Indonesian. Translations of this manuscript in Bengali, Persian, Urdu, Bengali, Turkish and Russian, are available for download free of charge.) 
African Constitutionalism and the Contingent Role of Islam. Philadelphia, PA: University of Pennsylvania Press (2006).
Toward an Islamic Reformation: Civil Liberties, Human Rights and International Law. Syracuse, NY: Syracuse University Press, 1990 (soft-cover edition by American University in Cairo, 1992). Translated in Arabic (1994), Indonesian (1995), Russian (1999), and Persian 2003.
Sudanese Criminal Law: General Principles of Criminal Responsibility (Arabic). Omdurman, Sudan: Huriya Press, 1985.
The Legitimacy of Constitution-Making Processes in the Arab World: An Islamic Perspective, in Constitutionalism, Human Rights and Islam after the Arab Spring (eds. Rainer Grote, Tilmann Röder and Ali El-Haj, Oxford/New York: OUP 2016)

Editor
Human Rights Under African Constitutions: Realizing the Promise for Ourselves. Philadelphia, PA: University of Pennsylvania Press, 2003.
Islamic Family Law in a Changing World: A Global Resource Book. London: Zed Books, 2002.
Cultural Transformation and Human Rights in Africa. London: Zed Books, 2002.
Proselytization and Communal Self-Determination in Africa. Maryknoll, NY: Orbis Books, 1999.
Universal Rights, Local Remedies: Legal Protection of Human Rights under the Constitutions of African Countries. London: Interights, 1999.
The Cultural Dimensions of Human Rights in the Arab World (Arabic). Cairo: Ibn Khaldoun Center, 1993.
Human Rights in Cross-Cultural Perspectives: Quest for Consensus. Philadelphia, PA: University of Pennsylvania Press, 1992.

Co-editor
With Ifi Amadiume: The Politics of Memory: Truth, Healing and Social Justice. London: Zed Books, 2000.
With J. D. Gort, H. Jansen, & H. M. Vroom: Human Rights and Religious Values: An Uneasy Relationship? Grand Rapids, MI: William B. Eerdmans Publishing Company, 1995.
With Francis Deng: Human Rights in Africa: Cross-Cultural Perspectives. Washington, DC: The Brookings Institution, 1990.

Translator
Arabic translation: Francis Deng: Cry of the Owl (a political novel). Cairo: Midlight, 1991.
English translation with an Introduction: Ustadh Mahmoud Mohamed Taha: The Second Message of Islam. Syracuse, NY: Syracuse University Press, 1987.

Foreword
Foreword in Pranoto Iskandar, Hukum HAM Internasional, Cianjur: The Institute for Migrant Rights Press, 2010.
Foreword in War on Error: Real Stories of American Muslims, University of Arkansas Press, 2007.
Foreword in Radical Conflict: Essays on Violence, Intractability, and Communication, Lexington, 2016.

Related media
Video Presentation Islam and the Secular State: Negotiating the Future of the Religious Law of Islam. University of Illinois at Urbana-Champaign (September 5, 2007).
Video Presentation Conversations With History: Islam and the Secular State (May 3, 2010).

References

External links
An-Naim's personal website
An-Naim's CV

Prof. An-Na'im's Advocacy Project, The Future of Shari'a: Secularism from an Islamic Perspective
The Synergy and Interdependence of Human Rights, Religion and Secularism by Abdullahi A. An-Na'im
Center for the Study of Law and Religion at Emory University
The Institute for Migrant Rights

Living people
Emory University faculty
Muslim reformers
Sudanese Muslims
Academic staff of the University of Pretoria
1946 births
African-American Muslims
Sudanese non-fiction writers